Ukrainian Railways (abbreviated as UZ) is a state-owned joint-stock company of rail transport in Ukraine, a monopoly that controls the vast majority of the railroad transportation in the country. Ukrainian Railways is the world's 6th largest rail passenger transporter and world's 7th largest freight transporter. Ukraine also has many stretches of standard-gauge railway (1,435 mm), and is currently working to expand these in order to improve its connections to the European Union. 

In 2015, Ukrainian Railways transformed through a merger of a state agency and a state-owned enterprise into a public joint stock company owned by state. Ukraine's State Administration of Railroad Transportation is subordinated to the Ministry of Infrastructure, administering the railways through the six territorial railway companies that immediately control and provide of all aspects of the railroad transportation and maintenance under the common Ukrzaliznytsia brand. The general director of the administration is appointed by the Cabinet of Ministers of Ukraine. The administration employs more than 403,000 people throughout the country.

During the 2022 Russian invasion of Ukraine, the Ukrainian Railways continued operating to evacuate and rescue millions of people from cities towards Europe. The rail links between Ukraine and Russia have been blown up by the Armed Forces of Ukraine to prevent their use by Russians, but the railways have continued operating within Ukraine and between Ukraine and Poland, Hungary, and Slovakia. One long-abandoned cross-border rail link with Poland was quickly reconstructed, and others which had been used only for freight have been quickly opened for passenger use. The rail service has evacuated over two million people from Ukraine on special evacuation trains. After some of the Black Sea ports became unavailable for grain export, rail became an export route to Europe. Several rail sections in the North and South became unusable.

Company structure

Financial history 
In 2008 the Ukrainian State Railways transported around 498.5 million tonnes of domestic freight and 69.8 million tonnes of international freight through Ukrainian territory. Freight transport figures were particularly high on transport Routes 3, 5 and 9, which saw a combined total of 105 million tonnes carried in 2008. Further, Ukrzaliznytsia served around 518.8 million passengers over the course of the year. The state railways ran with an annual consolidated budget of a little more than ₴40 billion (US$5 billion) in 2008.

By the end of 2005 the railways had produced a profit equivalent to ₴1.76 billion (US$220 million) from all their operations including freight, passenger service, associated services and the operation of subsidiaries. The total capital invested in fixed assets of the State Railways is thought to be equivalent to around ₴22 billion (US$4.4 billion). However, depreciation of these fixed assets is estimated to be around 57%, or in terms of rolling stock, closer to 66.7%.

In 2017, Ukrainian Railways (Ukrzaliznytsia) was the fourth-most profitable company in Ukraine with a revenue of UAH ₴74 billion.

In 2019, Ukrainian Railways confirmed intention to issue new Eurobond. Ukrainian Railways had the potential to increase its debt by US$1 billion, indicating a possible Eurobond issue. Recall, Ukrainian Railway's existing US$500 million Eurobond will be amortized by US$150M both in March and September 2019 and then by US$50 million semi-annually between March 2020 and September 2021. He also confirmed that Ukrainian Railway is now considering a Eurobond issue, on which he can further comment as soon as the government publishes a respective resolution (on its parameters). Kravtsov also highlighted that it's important for investors to have a clear understanding on how the borrowing will be serviced. Taking this into account, Ukrainian Railways has proposed a mechanism of automatic adjustment of freight railway rates based on Ukraine's producer price index.

Administrative structure 

The railways are split into six territorial railway companies: Donetsk, Lviv, Odesa, Southern, South-Western and Near-Dnipro. The subdivision is purely administrative as it doesn't correspond to the particular railway lines or branches. The names of regional railways are purely historic, inherited from the Russian and Austro-Hungarian Empires (for instance the 'South-Western Railway' actually operates the north-central part of Ukraine's rail network, while the 'Southern Railway' actually operates in the east of the country).

The six separate territorial railways each have their own directorates, located in the following cities:

 Donetsk Railway – Lyman (temporarily as Donetsk occupied by Russian military)
 Lviv Railway – Lviv
 Odessa Railway – Odessa
 Southern Railway – Kharkiv
 Southwestern Railway – Kyiv
 Cisdnieper Railway – Dnipro

Since 2014, the Cisdnieper Division of Crimean Railways is no longer under Ukrainian control.

The territorial railways are further divided into several territorial administrations, usually four or five. Such division helps in the assignment of commuter railway lines depending on location.

Company reform 
Ukrainian Railways suffer from a variety of issues mostly inherited from Soviet times. The reforms aim to address these issues in order to improve quality of service, transparency and governance.

Enactment of the law "On Railway Transport of Ukraine" 

The law seeks to harmonize Ukrainian rail-related legislation with European Union law. It sets out the basic requirements, responsibilities and rights of the infrastructure operator, the carrier and the owners of access tracks, rules for infrastructure management, basic requirements for railway rolling stock, and basic activities of railway rolling stock operators. The bill also provides for the creation of a system of public administration in the field of railway safety in accordance with the requirements of European Union legislation, the implementation of which is provided by the Association Agreement, which will increase transport safety in conditions of competition in the railway market. According to the Ministry of Infrastructure of Ukraine, the law, supported by European experts, serves as a starting point for real reforms in the industry.

Structural reform of Ukrainian Railways JSC 

The company is to be separated into verticals in accordance with modern practices. This involves the creation of separate freight, passenger, production and infrastructure operators within Ukrainian Railways by the end of 2021. According to the Ministry of Infrastructure of Ukraine, the project will ensure the transparency of financial flows within the company, and improve the quality of management of each activity. This will allow Ukrainian Railways to prepare for the emergence of private competitors in the railway market.

Subsidiaries and partners 

Ukrainian Railways owns or cooperates with several rail and train companies.

Infrastructure

Rolling stock 

Ukrzaliznytsia has several repair factories capable of producing locomotives and railcars. In addition there is a separate Kryukiv Railcar Engineering Factory and Dnieper Railcar Engineering that also produce railroad rolling stock for Ukrzaliznytsia and other companies for public transportation.

In November 2010, UZ agreed to buy 10 high-speed HRCS2 multiple unit interurban trainsets from Hyundai Rotem, with the prospect of a much larger order or joint venture for local production. The first two trains would be delivered in February 2012, two more in April and another two in May, when they will start operating. They will be rated as Inter City+ and will be connecting Kyiv with Kharkiv, Donetsk and Lviv, and at a later stage with Dnipro and Odesa.

In July 2011 UZ announced plans to buy 433 electric freight locomotives; 292 2EL4s from Transmashholding, and 141 locomotives (including class VL11M/6) from Elmavalmshenebeli (Tbilisi). Due to the 2014 Russian invasion of Ukraine Transmashholding was put on a sanctions list.

Because of the Russo-Ukrainian War, some factories that were producing locomotives and railcars were lost, such as Luhanskteplovoz (Luhansk Diesel Locomotive) and Stakhanov Railcar Engineering. Also because of the war debuted services were disrupted in January 2022, at the beginning of the war in February 2022,and it also has been widely reported some foreigners who were studying, working who were living Ukraine were denied service to leave the country, and stations that are used as bomb shelters.

In December 2017, UZ and GE Transportation agreed a to strategic partnership for the implementation of a 7-year rolling stock renewal program including the delivery of 30 locomotives to Ukrzaliznytsia in September 2018 with 40% manufactured in Ukraine.

Locomotives

Multiple units, railcars and diesel trains

Rolling stock renewal

Passenger cars 
The draft state budget for 2021 includes the purchasing of 100 new passenger cars from the Kryukiv Railway Car Building Works. In 2021 Ukrzaliznytsia will also launch its first disabled-friendly trains with dedicated wheelchair space.

Locomotives 
In 2018 Ukrainian Railways purchased 30 General Electric TE33AC Trident freight diesel locomotives. The 30 locomotives were planned to be the first stage of wider cooperation, including a 15-year partnership, and the replacement and modernization of additional Ukrainian rolling stock. Later in 2020, Ukrainian Railways CEO Volodymyr Zhmak stated that he does not see the need for further GE diesel locomotives, as the company will focus on electric traction due to its higher efficiency.

Following the appointment of Volodymyr Zhmak as CEO, UAH ₴400 million was reallocated within the company for urgent locomotive repairs until the end of 2020. As a part of this measure, the Lviv Locomotive Repair Plant has already received an order for the repair of 6 electric locomotives until the end of 2020.

In 2021, UAH ₴4.7 billion is planned to be spent on repairing the existing locomotive fleet.

As of 2020, Alstom is interested in the renewal of the Ukrainian Railways locomotive fleet through partial localization of production. Volodymyr Zhmak stated that Ukrainian Railways is initially interested in the purchase of 50 two-system electric freight locomotives. The purchase of Alstom locomotives would be financed by the French government.

Statistics
Key figures as of 2020:

Main track (1,520 mm) running length: 19,787 km
Electrified track: 9,319 km
Number of railway stations: 1,402
Number of freight (goods) wagons: 85,200
Number of passenger cars: 3,883 (in active operation - 2,681)
Number of locomotives: 1,944
 Number of electric locomotives: 1,627
 Number of diesel locomotives: 301
Average number of employees: 266,300 people
Passengers carried (2019): 149.6 million
Cargo transportation (2019): 312.4 million tonnes

Classification of passenger trains (railway lines) 

Railway lines are classified into commuter, regional, Intercity and EuroCity. Daytime trains are also distinguished into a separate class from those that run at night. Intercity lines are coded with single, double and triple digits, while commuter lines are coded with quadruple digits.

On 27 April 2011 in accordance with order No. 504/2011 rail industry specialists developed a new classification system of passenger trains for Ukrainian Railways.

The development of a new classification system for passenger trains in Ukraine was made necessary by the need to inform customers (passengers) about the level of service quality they could expect to find in various passenger trains. The new system is based on the class of train and carriages.

Given the quality of the service provided UZ asked the following classes of passenger trains:

Daytime passenger lines:
Euro City (EC) – Express (min. 90 km/h) daytime services on international routes which should offer a very high level of service and comfort. First and standard classes.
Inter City+ (IC+) – Express (min. 90 km/h) daytime services on domestic routes which should offer a very high level of service and comfort. First and standard classes. These services are currently operated by Hyundai Rotem HRCS2 multiple unit trains on routes between Kyiv and Kharkiv, Lviv, Dnipro, Zaporizhzhia, Pokrovsk, Kryvyi Rih, Konstantinivka (Ukraine), Odesa, Ternopil, Kropyvnytskyi. Besides, there is one international express Kyiv - Peremyshl (Poland).
Inter City (IC) – (max. 70 km/h – 90 km/h) daytime services on domestic routes which should offer a heightened level of service and comfort. First, standard and economy classes. These services are currently operated by Škoda UZ class 675 trains on routes between Kharkiv, Dnipro and Donetsk. 
Regional Express (РЕ) – (max. 70 km/h – 90 km/h) daytime services on domestic routes which should offer a standard level of service and comfort. First, standard and economy classes.
Regional train (РП) – (max. 70 km/h) daytime services on domestic routes which should offer a standard level of service and comfort. Standard and economy classes.
Nighttime passenger trains:
Euro Night (EN) – Express (min. 90 km/h) nighttime services on international routes which should offer a very high level of service and comfort. 2 berth coupe and 4 berth coupe classes.
Night Express (НЕ) (max. 70 km/h – 90 km/h) nighttime services on international and domestic routes which should offer a heightened level of service and comfort. 2 berth coupe, 4 berth coupe and platskarta classes.
Night fast (НШ) – (max. 50 km/h – 70 km/h) nighttime services on international and domestic routes which should offer a heightened level of service and comfort. 2 berth coupe, 4 berth coupe and platskarta classes.
Night passenger (НП) (max. 50 km/h) nighttime services on international and domestic routes which should offer a heightened level of service and comfort. 4 berth coupe and platskarta classes.

The advantages of the new classification system include full compliance with the classification of the European Union, compliance with Ukrainian and English names and abbreviations, linguistic and semantic consistency and clarity for customers in Ukraine and compatibility with existing and future tariff policy. The system is also not far displaced from the previous classification system used for passenger trains on the territory of Ukraine.

Education
The National Railway University in Dnipro currently has 10 faculties as well as a technical school, a business school and branches in Odesa and Lviv, 450 professors and 39 separate fields of study related to railway transport.

Directors

President
 1991-1993 Borys Oliynyk
General director
 1993-1997 Leonid Zheleznyak
 1997-2000 Anatoliy Slobodyan
 2000-2004 Heorhiy Kirpa
 2005-2005 Volodymyr Korniyenko
 2005-2005 Zenko Aftanaziv
 2005-2006 Vasyl Hladkikh
 2006-2007 Volodymyr Kozak
 2007-2007 Petro Naumenko
 2007-2008 Vasyl Melnychuk
 2008-2011 Mykhailo Kostiuk
 2011-2012 Volodymyr Kozak
 2013-2014 Serhiy Bolobolin
 2014-2014 Borys Ostapyuk
 2014-2015 Maksym Blank (acting)
 2015-2015 Oleksandr Zavhorodniy (acting)

Board director
 2015-2016 Oleksandr Zavhorodniy (acting)
 2016-2016 Yevhen Kravtsov (acting)
 2016-2016 Vitaliy Zhurakovskyi (acting)
 2016-2017 Wojciech Balczun
 2017-2020 Yevhen Kravtsov (acting) "Ukrzaliznytsia" was temporarily headed by Marček Zhelko, UNIAN (5 February 2020)
 2020 Marček Zhelko (acting)
 2020 Ivan Yuryk (acting)
 2020-2021 Volodymyr Zhmak
 2021-2023 Oleksandr Kamyshin

See also
 Rail transport in Ukraine
Transport in Ukraine
 Railway electrification system

Notes

References

External links 

 
 

 
1991 establishments in Ukraine
Railway companies established in 1991
Government agencies established in 1991

Government-owned companies of Ukraine
Ukrainian brands
Government-owned railway companies